Nick Denes Field is a baseball venue located on the campus of Western Kentucky University in Bowling Green, Kentucky, United States.  It is home to the Western Kentucky Hilltoppers baseball team, a member of the NCAA Division I Conference USA. The field has a capacity of 1,500 people, 1,000 of which consists of chair-backed seating.  In 2010, $1 million renovations added the Paul C. Orberson Baseball Clubhouse. The clubhouse is located down the left field at the venue.

See also
 List of NCAA Division I baseball venues

References

Western Kentucky Hilltoppers baseball
College baseball venues in the United States
Baseball venues in Kentucky
Buildings and structures in Bowling Green, Kentucky
1969 establishments in Kentucky
Sports venues completed in 1969